Vermetus granulatus is a species of sea snail, a marine gastropod mollusk in the family Vermetidae, the worm snails or worm shells.

Description

Distribution

References

External links

Vermetidae
Taxa named by Johann Ludwig Christian Gravenhorst
Gastropods described in 1831